Water polo was played at the 1951 Asian Games in New Delhi on 11 March 1951. Two nations entered the water polo event - India and Singapore. The host nation India won the gold medal after beating Singapore 6–4.

Medalists

Squads

Results

Final standing

References 
 Report of the first Asian Games held at New Delhi

External links 
 OCA official website

 
1951 Asian Games events
1951
Asian Games
1951 Asian Games